Hakha Chin, or Laiholh, is a Kuki-Chin language spoken by 446,264 people, mostly in Myanmar. The total figure includes 2,000 Zokhua and 60,100 Hakha speakers. The speakers are largely concentrated in Chin State in western Myanmar and Mizoram in eastern India, with a small number of speakers in south-eastern Bangladesh.

Distribution
The Hakha Chin (Lai) speakers are largely in Chin State, Burma and Mizoram in Northeast India, with a small number of speakers in south-eastern Bangladesh. Nowadays, more than fifty thousand Hakha Chin speakers are living in the Western countries, such as Canada, Denmark, Germany, Norway, and the United States, as well as Australia and New Zealand.

Mutual intelligibility
Hakha Chin serves as a lingua franca in most parts of Chin State and is a native language in Hakha, Thantlang, and parts of Matupi. Derived from the same Lai dialect and sharing 85% of their phonology, Falam Chin speakers can easily communicate with Hakha speakers. As the capital of Chin State, Hakha provides government employment and business opportunities to people living elsewhere in Chin State. These people live here temporarily or permanently, and their families eventually learn how to speak Lai holh (Hakha).

The Chin people use Latin script (Hakha alphabet) as their writing system.

Phonology

Syllable structure
Words in the Hakha Chin language are predominantly monosyllabic with some sesqui syllables featuring a "reduced syllable". Full syllables are either open or closed with a rising, falling, or low tone.

Consonants 

The Hakha Chin language differentiates between voiced, voiceless, and voiceless aspirated obstruents. Additionally, two sets of sonorants are realised.

Consonants  occurring in syllable-final position may also occur as glottalized .

The unattested parent language, Proto-Chin, featured a voiced velar plosive . The phoneme itself was lost in all of its daughter languages, due to a spirantisation to ɣ, which a labialisation followed afterwards. Only certain loanwords, not native words, have the voiced velar plosive.

In the Hakha alphabet,  transcribes the glottal fricative in initial position, but a glottal stop in coda position. Voiceless approximants are distinguished in writing from their voiced counterparts with a prefixed .

Vowels
The Hakha language features seven vowels which may be long or short. Allophones occur for closed syllables.

In final position, /e/ can be heard as [ɛ].

The Hakha language also features diphthongs.

Grammar
Hakha-Chin is a subject-object-verb (SOV) language, and negation follows the verb.

Literacy and literature
Literacy rates are lower for older generations and higher in younger generations. The Hakha-Chin language uses the Latin script and reportedly the Pau Cin Hau script, unlike most languages of India and Bangladesh which use Devanagari or other Southeast Asian alphabets. Between 1978 and 1999, the Bible was translated into the language.

Distribution
The Hakha-Chin language is also known as Haka, Baung-shè, and Lai in Burma, India, and Bangladesh. The Hakha-Chin people are largely members of the Lai tribe. In India, they are a Scheduled Tribe, which means the government recognizes them as a distinct people. As they mostly live in hilly or even mountainous remote areas, most Hakha-Chin speakers rely on swidden agriculture. Hakha-Chin speakers are predominantly Christian.

Burma
As of 1991, there were 100,000 Hakha-Chin speakers in Burma. Dialects vary from village to village.

Bangladesh
As of 2000, there were 1,264 Hakha-Chin speakers in Bangladesh. In Bangladesh, the Senthang dialect Shonshe is spoken and it may be a language in its own right.

India
As of 1996, there were 345,000 Hakha-Chin speakers in India, mostly in the Lawngtlai, Lunglei, and Aizawl districts of Mizoram as well as the southernmost tip of Assam. In India, the language is also known as Lai Pawi and Lai Hawlh and is taught in some primary schools. Most of its younger speakers in India are literate.

Bibliography
Peterson, David A. (2003). "Hakha Lai" In Graham Thurgood and Randy J. LaPolla, eds. The Sino-Tibetan Languages, 409–426. London: Routledge

See also
Lai languages
Lai people

References

External links

Online English to Chin (Hakha) Dictionary with Audio Pronunciations
English to Haka Chin Online Dictionary

Languages of Mizoram
Languages of Myanmar
Languages of Bangladesh
Kuki-Chin languages
Subject–object–verb languages